Sellades is a village in the municipal unit of Kompoti in the regional unit of Arta, Greece. In 2011 its population was 606 for the town and 714 for the community (including the village Alonia). Sellades is 1 km northwest of Kompoti and 10 km southeast of Arta. The Greek National Road 5/E951 (Antirrio - Agrinio - Arta - Ioannina) passes southwest of the village.

Population

History

The origin of the name "Sellades" is disputed. According to one theory the first inhabitants of the village were Selloi people from Dodona. Another theory states that the inhabitants were involved in manufacturing saddles ("sela"), or that the village is shaped like a saddle. Strabo described the area of Makrynoros as Selaida (Σελαΐδα). Another theory is that the first inhabitants had as their last name Selladitis (Σελλαδίτης).

The first written reference to the village is in a Venetian documents dating from 1696, saying that Sellades and the neighbouring village Megarchi paid tribute to the Venetians.

External links
 http://www.sellades.com
Sellades on GTP Travel Pages

References

Populated places in Arta (regional unit)